Broward may refer to:
Broward County, Florida
Napoleon B. Broward (1857–1910), Florida governor after which the county is named
Robert C. Broward (1926–2015), American architect and author

See also